ESBO may refer to:
 Epoxidized soybean oil, a part of the PVC plastics manufacturing process
 Eisenbahn-Bau- und Betriebsordnung für Schmalspurbahnen, a German regulation for narrow-gauge railways

See also Esbo the local name of the town Espoo in Finland.